FESCO may refer to:

 Faisalabad Electric Supply Company
 Fesco Distributors, Inc.
 Far East Shipping Company
 Fédération des Scouts de la République démocratique du Congo
 Fesco Transport Group